The Drifters Girl is a jukebox musical with a book by Ed Curtis based on an idea by Tina Treadwell. It is based on the story of the American vocal group The Drifters and their manager Faye Treadwell, and features their music.

Production history 
The musical made its world premiere at the Theatre Royal, Newcastle on 9 October, running until 23 October 2021 prior to a run in London's West End at the Garrick Theatre from 4 November 2021 until 26 March 2022. The production is directed by Jonathan Church with a set designed by Anthony Ward, costumes by Faye Fullerton, choreographed by Karen Bruce, lighting design by Ben Cracknell, sound design by Tom Marshall, and music direction by Chris Egan. The show is produced by Michael Harrison and David Ian. Beverley Knight stars as Faye Treadwell with Adam J. Bernard, Tarinn Callender, Matt Henry and Tosh Wanogho-Maud as The Drifters who also co-created the musical. The musical was originally announced in November 2019 to open in September 2020, however was postponed due to the COVID-19 pandemic.

The production received two Laurence Olivier Award nominations in 2022, for Best New Musical and Best Actress in a Musical. Knight also received a WhatsOnStage Award nomination for her performance.

The World Premiere Cast Recording for the musical was recorded by Knight, Bernard, Callender, Henry and Wanogho-Maud at Abbey Road Studios and was released on 6 May 2022.

Knight played her final two shows as Faye Treadwell on 2 July 2022 and was succeeded by Broadway actress Felicia Boswell in her West End debut.

Musical numbers 
The musical features songs made famous by The Drifters including;

 "Hello Happiness"/"Kissin’ In The Back Row Of The Movies"/"There Goes My First Love" - The Drifters
 "Money Money" - Clyde
 "Follow Me" - Faye
 "Whatcha Gonna Do" - Clyde, Johnny and Ben
 "Fools Fall in Love" - Clyde
 "Nobody But Me" - Faye
 "Save The Last Dance For Me" - Ben
 "This Magic Moment" - Ben
 "Stand By Me" - Ben
 "Sweets for My Sweet" - Ben
 "I Don't Wanna Go On Without You"/"Stand By Me" - Faye
 "Saturday Night At The Movies" - Johnny
 "There Goes My Baby" - George
 "When My Little Girl Is Smiling" - Clyde
 "Under The Boardwalk" - Ben
 "In the Land of Make Believe" - Clyde and Ben
 "Harlem Child" - Faye
 "Kissin’ In The Back Row Of The Movies" - Johnny
 "There Goes My First Love" - Johnny
 "Come On Over To My Place" - Johnny
 "There Goes My Baby" (reprise) - Faye and George
 "You're More Than a Number in My Little Red Book" - Faye and The Drifters

Cast and characters

Awards and nominations

References

External links
 Official website

2021 musicals
Jukebox musicals
West End musicals
The Drifters
Musicals inspired by real-life events
British musicals